Hermann Heinrich Becker (15 September 1820 in Elberfeld – 9 December 1885 in Cologne) was a German politician and member of the DFP. Becker was born to Dr. Hermann Becker and Theodora Helene Caroline Wilhelmine Friedrike Becker, née Krackrügge. Becker studied law at Heidelberg, Bonn and Berlin, and graduated on 10 May 1847. 

He was mayor of Dortmund from 1870 to 1875 and mayor of Cologne from 1875 to 1885. On 8 October 1877 he married Henriette Metzmacher (1847– 1928), daughter of his old friend Carl Metzmacher. However, the marriage did not last very long. Becker died on 9 December 1885 from tuberculosis.

1820 births
1885 deaths
People from Elberfeld
People from the Rhine Province
German Protestants
German Progress Party politicians
Members of the 1st Reichstag of the German Empire
Members of the Prussian House of Lords
Mayors of Dortmund
Mayors of Cologne
University of Bonn alumni
Politicians from Wuppertal